Lamproxynella unicolor is a species of tephritid or fruit flies in the genus Lamproxynella of the family Tephritidae.

Distribution
Argentina, Chile.

References

Tephritinae
Insects described in 1836
Diptera of South America